Fernanda França da Silva (born 25 September 1989) is a Brazilian female handballer who plays as a left wing for Super Amara Bera Bera and the Brazilian national team.

Achievements
Austrian League:
Winner: 2012, 2013, 2014
Austrian Cup:
Winner: 2012, 2013, 2014
Romanian National League:
Winner: 2015, 2016
Romanian Cup: 
Finalist: 2015
EHF Champions League:
Winner: 2016
EHF Cup Winners' Cup: 
Winner: 2013
Pan American Games:
Winner: 2011
World Championship:
Winner: 2013
Pan American Championship:
Winner: 2011, 2013
South American Championship:
Winner: 2013
Provident Cup:
Winner: 2013

Awards and recognition
 All Star Team Left Wing of the Pan American Championship: 2009
 Austrian Handball Federation Left Wing of the Year – Women: 2013
 Pan American Championship Top Scorer: 2013

References

1989 births
Living people
People from São Bernardo do Campo
Brazilian female handball players
Handball players at the 2011 Pan American Games
Handball players at the 2015 Pan American Games
Handball players at the 2012 Summer Olympics
Handball players at the 2016 Summer Olympics
Expatriate handball players
Brazilian expatriate sportspeople in Austria
Brazilian expatriate sportspeople in Germany
Brazilian expatriate sportspeople in Romania
Brazilian expatriate sportspeople in Spain
Olympic handball players of Brazil
Pan American Games gold medalists for Brazil
Pan American Games medalists in handball
Medalists at the 2015 Pan American Games
Medalists at the 2011 Pan American Games
Sportspeople from São Paulo (state)
21st-century Brazilian women